The 2022 Evian Championship was played 21–24 July at the Evian Resort Golf Club in Évian-les-Bains, France. It was the 29th Evian Championship (the first 20 played as the Evian Masters), and the tenth as a major championship on the LPGA Tour. The event was televised by Golf Channel in the United States and Sky Sports in the United Kingdom.

Brooke Henderson won with a score of 267, 17-under-par, a stroke ahead of Sophia Schubert.

Field
The field for the tournament was set at 132, and most earned exemptions based on past performance on the Ladies European Tour, the LPGA Tour, or with a high ranking in the Women's World Golf Rankings.

These were the exemption categories for the 2022 Evian Championship.

1. Evian invitations (six)

Anna Davis (a), Rachel Heck (a), Aline Krauter (a), Agathe Laisné, Benedetta Moresco (a), Rose Zhang (a)

2. Winner of the Jabra Ladies Open

Tiia Koivisto

3. Past Winners Evian Masters

Angela Stanford

4. Top 50 from Rolex World Ranking

Marina Alex, An Na-rin, Pia Babnik, Céline Boutier, Choi Hye-jin, Chun In-gee, Ally Ewing, Ayaka Furue, Hannah Green, Georgia Hall, Mina Harigae, Nasa Hataoka, Brooke Henderson, Charley Hull, Ji Eun-hee, Ariya Jutanugarn, Megan Khang, Kim A-lim, Kim Hyo-joo, Kim Sei-young, Ko Jin-young, Lydia Ko, Jessica Korda, Nelly Korda, Jennifer Kupcho, Lee Jeong-eun, Minjee Lee, Lin Xiyu, Nanna Koerstz Madsen, Leona Maguire, Yuna Nishimura, Anna Nordqvist, Ryann O'Toole, Inbee Park, Park Min-ji, Ryu So-yeon, Madelene Sagström, Mao Saigo, Lizette Salas, Yuka Saso, Hinako Shibuno, Patty Tavatanakit, Atthaya Thitikul

5. Majors Winners

Kim In-kyung, Park Sung-hyun, Sophia Popov

6. LPGA Tournament Winners

Cristie Kerr, Gina Kim

7. LET OOM

Olivia Cowan, Manon De Roey, Linn Grant, Johanna Gustavsson, Stephanie Kyriacou, Meghan MacLaren, Sanna Nuutinen, Lee-Anne Pace, Magdalena Simmermacher, Marianne Skarpnord, Maja Stark

8. Top 10 & Ties Previous Year Evian Championship

Pajaree Anannarukarn, Yealimi Noh, Amy Yang

9. Winner U.S. Women's Amateur Championship

Jensen Castle (a)

10. Winner British Ladies Amateur Championship

Jess Baker (a)

11. Winner Women's Amateur Asia-Pacific Championship

Mizuki Hashimoto (a)

12. Winner Latin America Women's Amateur Championship

Valery Plata (a)

13. CME Globe Points

Brittany Altomare, Aditi Ashok, Ashleigh Buhai, Matilda Castren, Jennifer Chang, Peiyun Chien, Chella Choi, Carlota Ciganda, Jenny Coleman, Allisen Corpuz, Lauren Coughlin, Perrine Delacour, Amanda Doherty, Gemma Dryburgh, Jodi Ewart Shadoff, Isi Gabsa, Esther Henseleit, Hong Yae-eun, Hsu Wei-ling, Janie Jackson, Moriya Jutanugarn, Haeji Kang, Sarah Kemp, Frida Kinhult, Cheyenne Knight, Bronte Law, Maude-Aimee Leblanc, Alison Lee, Andrea Lee, Lee Jeong-eun, Ruixin Liu, Yu Liu, Gaby López, Caroline Masson, Stephanie Meadow, Wichanee Meechai, Morgane Métraux, Su-Hyun Oh, Amy Olson, Annie Park, Pornanong Phatlum, Mel Reid, Paula Reto, Pauline Roussin-Bouchard, Sarah Schmelzel, Sophia Schubert, Jenny Shin, Jennifer Song, Lauren Stephenson, Thidapa Suwannapura, Emma Talley, Kelly Tan, Charlotte Thomas, Alana Uriell, Albane Valenzuela, Lilia Vu, Lindsey Weaver-Wright, Angel Yin

Course

Source:

Round summaries

First round
Thursday, 21 July 2022

Ayaka Furue shot an 8-under-par 63 to take a one stroke lead over Brooke Henderson and Nelly Korda. Defending champion Minjee Lee was seven strokes back at −1.

Source:

Second round
Friday, 22 July 2022

Brooke Henderson shot a second consecutive round of 64 to take a three-stroke lead over Nelly Korda. First round leader Ayaka Furue shot a 72 to drop seven strokes off the lead. Defending champion Minjee Lee was in a tied for 30th place. The cut was at 142, even par, with 73 golfers advancing to the weekend.

Source:

Third round
Saturday, 23 July 2022

Brooke Henderson shot a 68 to stay in first place, two strokes ahead of Ryu So-yeon.

Source:

Final round
Sunday, 24 July 2022

Source:

References

External links

The Evian Championship
Golf tournaments in France
Evian Championship
Evian Championship
Evian Championship